Evgeny Gladskikh (born 24 April 1982 ) is a Russian ice hockey player who is currently playing for Torpedo Nizhny Novgorod in the Kontinental Hockey League (KHL). He was selected by Vancouver Canucks in the 4th round (114th overall) of the 2001 NHL Entry Draft.

Career statistics

External links

Vancouver Canucks draft picks
Living people
1982 births
Russian ice hockey right wingers
Atlant Moscow Oblast players
Avangard Omsk players
HC Almaty players
HC Donbass players
HC Sarov players
Metallurg Magnitogorsk players
Rubin Tyumen players
Torpedo Nizhny Novgorod players
People from Magnitogorsk
Sportspeople from Chelyabinsk Oblast